Wally Colliss (22 May 1908 – 8 October 1977) was an Australian rules footballer who played with Essendon in the Victorian Football League (VFL).

Notes

External links 

1908 births
1977 deaths
Australian rules footballers from Victoria (Australia)
Essendon Football Club players